Yellowstone often refers to Yellowstone National Park in the United States.

Yellowstone may also refer to:

Places
Yellowstone, Alberta, a village
Yellowstone, Indiana, an unincorporated community
Yellowstone, Wisconsin, an unincorporated community
Yellowstone County, Montana
Yellowstone Caldera, volcanic caldera and supervolcano under Yellowstone National Park
Yellowstone River

Film and television
Yellowstone (film), a 1936 film
Yellowstone (British TV series), 2009 BBC documentary series about Yellowstone National Park
Yellowstone (American TV series), a 2018 television drama

Ships
Yellowstone (steamboat), an 1831 side-wheeler packet boat
USS Yellowstone (ID-2657), a cargo ship in commission from 1918 to 1919
USS Yellowstone (AD-27), a destroyer tender in commission from 1946 to 1974
USS Yellowstone (AD-41), a destroyer tender in commission from 1980 to 1996

Other uses
Yellowstone (supercomputer), at the NCAR-Wyoming Supercomputing Center
Yellowstone Bourbon, an alcoholic beverage
Boeing Yellowstone Project, a Boeing Company project to replace its entire civil aircraft portfolio with advanced technology aircraft
2-8-8-4 or Yellowstone, a locomotive type

See also
Huangshi (disambiguation)
USS Yellowstone, a list of ships
Guri i Kuq (translated as "yellow rock" from Albanian), a mountain in Kosovo
Wong Shek (translated as "yellow stone" in Cantonese), a place in Hong Kong.